ORG-25435 is a synthetic drug developed by Organon International, which acts as a GABAA receptor positive allosteric modulator, and produces sedative effects. It has been researched for use as an intravenous anesthetic agent, with positive results in initial trials, although negative side effects like hypotension and tachycardia, as well as unpredictable pharmacokinetics at higher doses, have meant it has ultimately not been adopted for medical use.

References 

Hypnotics
GABAA receptor positive allosteric modulators